The Wisconsin Intercollegiate Athletic Conference (WIAC) is a college athletic conference that competes in the NCAA's Division III. In women's gymnastics, it competes alongside Division I and II members, as the NCAA sponsors a single championship event open to members of all NCAA divisions. As the name implies, member teams are located in the state of Wisconsin, although there are three associate members from Minnesota and one from Illinois. All full members are part of the University of Wisconsin System.

History
In 1913, representatives from Wisconsin's eight normal schools—Superior Normal School (now the University of Wisconsin–Superior), River Falls State Normal School (now the University of Wisconsin-River Falls), Stevens Point Normal School (now the University of Wisconsin–Stevens Point), La Crosse State Normal School (now the University of Wisconsin-La Crosse), Oshkosh State Normal School (now the University of Wisconsin–Oshkosh), Whitewater Normal School (now the University of Wisconsin–Whitewater), Milwaukee State Normal School (now the University of Wisconsin–Milwaukee) and Platteville Normal School (now the University of Wisconsin–Platteville)--met in Madison to organize the Inter-Normal Athletic Conference of Wisconsin.  The Stout Institute (now the University of Wisconsin–Stout) joined in 1914, followed by Eau Claire State Normal School (now the University of Wisconsin–Eau Claire) in 1917.

The conference evolved with the growing educational mission of its member schools.  It changed its name to the Wisconsin State Teachers College Conference in 1926, and the Wisconsin State College Conference in 1951.  Finally, in 1964, it became the Wisconsin State University Conference.

In 1971, the member schools of the WSUC joined with the University of Wisconsin–Madison, University of Wisconsin–Parkside and Carthage College to form the Wisconsin Women's Intercollegiate Athletic Conference.  By 1975, UW–Milwaukee, Carroll College, the University of Wisconsin–Green Bay and Marquette University had also joined.  With the dissolution of the Association of Intercollegiate Athletics for Women in 1982, the member schools joined their male counterparts in either the NCAA or NAIA.  By 1993, the non-NCAA Division III members had all dropped out, resulting in the WWIAC having the same membership as the WSUC.  Under the circumstances, a merger was inevitable.  In 1996, Gary Karner was named commissioner of both the WSUC and the WWIAC.  The two conferences formally merged in 1997 to form the current WIAC.

Effective with the 2001–02 academic year, Lawrence University joined the conference in the sport of wrestling. Three Minnesota schools, Gustavus Adolphus College, Hamline University and Winona State University, became members of the conference in the sport of women's gymnastics during the 2004–05 academic year. In 2009–10, the conference added men’s soccer as a sponsored sport with the announcement of Michigan school Finlandia University as an affiliate member. Lawrence discontinued its affiliation with the WIAC in wrestling.

The conference remained unusually stable over the years; the only changes in full membership being the departures of UW–Milwaukee in 1964 and UW–Superior in 2015.

Centennial celebration
The ninth-oldest conference in the nation, the WIAC celebrated its centennial year during the 2012–13 academic year. Additionally, the WIAC is the most successful NCAA Division III conference in history, boasting NCAA National Championships in 15 different sports. At the beginning of the 2011–12 academic year, the conference had claimed a nation-leading 92 NCAA National Championships.

To celebrate its centennial, the conference named All-Time Teams in each sport that is currently or was previously recognized as a "championship" sport within the conference. Furthermore, the WIAC commissioned a commemorative work of art, created by Tim Cortes, and has also created a two-year calendar in celebration of its centennial.

The celebration was headlined by its Centennial Banquet held on August 4, 2012, at the Alliant Energy Center in Madison, Wisconsin.  Among the honorees at the event were the All-Time Team members and the inaugural class to the WIAC Hall of Fame.

Chronological timeline

 1913 - The WIAC was founded as the Inter-Normal Athletic Conference of Wisconsin (INACW). Charter members included La Crosse State Normal School (now the University of Wisconsin–La Crosse), Milwaukee State Normal School (now the University of Wisconsin–Milwaukee), Oshkosh State Normal School (now the University of Wisconsin–Oshkosh), Platteville Normal School (now the University of Wisconsin–Platteville), River Falls State Normal School (now the University of Wisconsin–River Falls), Stevens Point Normal School (now the University of Wisconsin–Stevens Point), Superior Normal School (now the University of Wisconsin–Superior) Whitewater Normal School (now the University of Wisconsin–Whitewater), effective beginning the 1913-14 academic year.
 1914 - Stout Institute (now the University of Wisconsin–Stout) joined the INACW, effective in the 1914-15 academic year.
 1917 - Eau Claire State Normal School (now the University of Wisconsin–Eau Claire) joined the INACW, effective in the 1917-18 academic year.
 1926 - The INACW has been rebranded as the Wisconsin State Teachers College Conference, effective in the 1926-27 academic year.
 1951 - The WSTCC has been rebranded as the Wisconsin State College Conference, effective in the 1951-52 academic year.
 1964 - Wisconsin–Milwaukee left the WSTCC, effective after the 1963-64 academic year.
 1964 - The WSCC has been rebranded as the Wisconsin State University Conference, effective in the 1964-65 academic year.
 1997 - The WSUC was merged with the Wisconsin Women's Intercollegiate Athletic Conference (WWIAC, a women's athletic conference) and was rebranded as the Wisconsin Intercollegiate Athletic Conference (WIAC), effective in the 1997-98 academic year.
 2001 - Lawrence University joined the WIAC as an affiliate member for wrestling, effective in the 2001-02 academic year.
 2004 - Gustavus Adolphus College, Hamline University and Winona State University joined the WIAC as associate members for gymnastics, effective in the 2004-05 academic year.
 2009 - Lawrence left the WIAC as an affiliate member for wrestling, effective after the 2008-09 academic year.
 2009 - Finlandia University joined the WIAC as an affiliate member for men's soccer, effective the 2009 fall season (2009-10 academic year).
 2015 - Wisconsin–Superior left the WIAC to join the Upper Midwest Athletic Conference (UMAC), effective after the 2014-15 academic year; while remaining in the conference as an affiliate member for men's & women's ice hockey, effective beginning the 2015-16 academic year.
 2016 - Finlandia left the WIAC as an affiliate member for men's soccer, effective after the 2015 fall season (2015-16 academic year).
 2017 - Illinois Institute of Technology (Illinois Tech or IIT) joined the WIAC as an affiliate member for baseball, effective in the 2018 spring season (2017-18 academic year).
 2018 - Illinois Tech (IIT) left the WIAC as an affiliate member for baseball, effective after the 2018 spring season (2017-18 academic year).
 2018 - Finlandia re-joined back to the WIAC as an affiliate member (this time for baseball), effective in the 2019 spring season (2018-19 academic year).
 2019 - Northland College joined the WIAC as an associate member for men's and women's ice hockey, effective in the 2019-20 academic year.

Member schools

Current members
The WIAC currently has eight full members, all are public schools:

Notes

Affiliate members
The WIAC currently has five affiliate members, all but two are private schools:

Notes

Former members
The WIAC had two former full members, both were public schools:

Notes

Former affiliate members
The WIAC had three former affiliate members, all were private schools:

Notes

Membership timeline

Sports
Member institutions field men's and women's teams in cross country, basketball, ice hockey, track and field, and swimming and diving.  Men's teams are fielded for baseball, football,  and wrestling.  Women's teams are fielded for golf, gymnastics, soccer, softball, tennis and volleyball. The WIAC is the only NCAA Division III all-sports conference that does not sponsor men's soccer.

National championship teams
Baseball
UW-Oshkosh: 1985, 1994
UW-Whitewater: 2005, 2014

Men's basketball
UW-Whitewater: 1984, 1989, 2012, 2014
UW-Platteville: 1991, 1995, 1998, 1999
UW-Stevens Point: 2004, 2005, 2010, 2015
UW-Oshkosh: 2019

Women's Basketball
UW-Stevens Point: 1987, 2002
UW-Oshkosh: 1996

Men's Cross Country
UW-Oshkosh: 1988, 1989, 1990, 2002
UW-La Crosse: 1996, 2001, 2005
UW-Eau Claire: 2015
Women's Cross Country
UW-La Crosse: 1983
UW-Oshkosh: 1987, 1988, 1991, 1996
UW-Eau Claire: 2009

Football
UW-La Crosse: 1992, 1995
UW-Whitewater: 2007, 2009, 2010, 2011, 2013, 2014

Men's Golf
UW-Eau Claire: 2001

Men's Ice Hockey
UW-River Falls: 1988, 1994
UW-Stevens Point: 1989, 1990, 1991, 1993, 2016, 2019
UW-Superior: 2002
UW-Eau Claire: 2013

Softball
UW-Stevens Point: 1998
UW-Eau Claire: 2008

Men's Indoor Track & Field
UW-La Crosse: 1987, 1988, 1991, 1992, 1993, 1994, 1997, 2001, 2002, 2003, 2004, 2005, 2006, 2008, 2009, 2013, 2014, 2017, 2023
UW-Oshkosh: 2009
UW-Eau Claire: 2015, 2016
Men's Outdoor Track & Field
UW-La Crosse: 1988, 1991, 1992, 1993, 1997, 2001, 2002, 2003, 2004, 2006, 2007, 2013, 2015, 2016, 2017
UW-Oshkosh: 2009

Women's Indoor Track & Field
UW-Oshkosh: 1994-96, 2004, 2005, 2006, 2011, 2013, 2014
UW-La Crosse: 2015, 2023

Women's Outdoor Track & Field
UW-La Crosse: 1983, 1984, 2015
UW-Oshkosh: 1990, 1991, 1995, 1996, 1997, 2004, 2006, 2007, 2011
UW-River Falls: 2008

Women's Volleyball
UW-Whitewater: 2002, 2005
UW-Eau Claire: 2021

Conference facilities

References

External links
 

 
College sports in Wisconsin